Bad Endbach is the westernmost municipality in Marburg-Biedenkopf district of the state of Hesse in Germany, and borders on the Lahn-Dill district.

Geography

Location
Bad Endbach lies in the Lahn-Dill Bergland (ie Highland) in the foothills of the Rothaargebirge and Westerwald mountain ranges in a changeable low mountain range landscape between the towns of Marburg and Herborn.

Within the community's territory, in the Hartenrod area, rises the brook known as the Salzböde, along which stretches much of the municipal area.

Geology
Geologically, the area belongs mainly to the Devonian and Culm formation in which slate, greywacke and diabase predominate.

Neighbouring communities
Clockwise from the north, the following towns and communities border on the community of Bad Endbach:

The communities of Angelburg, Steffenberg and Dautphetal lie to the northwest, north and northeast respectively. Next, to the east, comes the town of Gladenbach. All these municipalities lie, like Bad Endbach itself, in Marburg-Biedenkopf district. Further, there is the community of Bischoffen in the south and the community of Siegbach in the west, both of which belong to the Lahn-Dill district.

Community divisions
Bad Endbach's municipal area is divided into eight constituent communities.

History

Amalgamations
On 1 February 1971, the two communities of Endbach and Wommelshausen combined into one community of Endbach, and likewise the two communities of Hartenrod and Schlierbach did the same on 31 December of the same year, taking the former's name. On 1 April 1972, Günterod was amalgamated with Endbach, before in the end, on 1 July 1974, as a result of municipal reform in Hesse, Endbach and Hartenrod were not only amalgamated with each other, but also with Bottenhorn, Dernbach and Hülshof to form the new community of Bad Endbach.

Politics

Municipal council
As of municipal elections on 6 March 2016 and formerly on 27 March 2011, respective on 26 March 2006, municipal council seats are apportioned thus:

Coat of arms
The municipal arms might be described thus: In vert six bendlets sinister wavy argent; above a sun Or; below a watering can Or.

Town partnerships
  Ambt Montfort, Netherlands

Culture and sightseeing
In Wommelshausen stands a noteworthy old chapel of Romanesque origins that was apparently remodelled or renovated in the 13th century in the early Gothic style. It is said to be an important historic building as it has hardly changed over the ages. Timbers found in the demonstrably remodelled east gable come from the year 1268 (the year that they were felled). The building that stands today is, however, much older, likely by as much as 200 or 250 years. During renovation work, clues were found on the south side in the inner room to an earlier building. This earlier building might have been a wooden church on a stone foundation, and might have been built in the time of the Irish-Scottish mission in the area. Irish-Scottish missionaries were active in the vicinity even before Saint Boniface, as digs at the Büraburg Monastery prove (as do those at, among others, Wetter and the Christenberg). The building standing today might have been built under the influence of the Worms Bauhütte (a forerunner to the later guilds), as it bears a keen likeness to the rather bigger Magnus-Kirche (church) in Worms. The Bishopric of Worms once had vast holdings throughout the area.

Two small, high windows on the building's south side have round frames inside, but oddly squeezed, peaked frames on the outside, a sure sign of remodelling. The former priest's entrance in the south front wall is definitely Romanesque. The layman's entrance lies on the north side underneath the later enlarged window. In the west wall is found a further window. The chapel once had an oblong choir which was broken up and its opening walled up in the 18th century. Measurements of the building's inner dimensions yield a width of about 6.95 m and a length of about 10.15 m. The walls are about 1.2 m thick. The builders, however, used a "foot", believed to average about 33 cm long to do their measurements. The building stones were boulders, greywacke, on rich beds of mortar. There are no hewn stones. The inner room is a plain chamber. The building has a ridge turret as a bell tower. It never had a steeple like other churches in the area. These are the main things that set the building apart from others in the area. The inner room is further an example of one of the earliest galleries in the whole area.

The chapel is said to have once been built over a spring. Its location at the lowest place in the village lends weight to this story. It was supposedly a chapel to Saint Mary before the Reformation, and served as a pilgrimage site because of the spring, which was said to work wonders, and which was said to have come forth from under the choir. There is a pleasant anecdote about this.

Christian communities

Regular events
Easter hiking week, Whitsun hiking week, Health days, Music days, Autumn hiking week, Sinnlos youth evangelization .

Economy and infrastructure
Bad Endbach earns its livelihood overridingly from its spa business and tourism. There are no big companies operating in the community.

Spas
Bad Endbach offers an extensive network of hiking trails, a choice of specialized offerings for migraine therapy and vein treatments as well as clinical aftercare.

References

External links
 Bad Endbach's official website
 

Spa towns in Germany
Marburg-Biedenkopf